Girl Who Got Away is the fourth studio album by English recording artist Dido, released in Europe on 4 March 2013, and in North America on 26 March 2013 by RCA Records. The album serves as the follow-up to 2008's Safe Trip Home. Recording for the album began in 2009 and ended in 2012, taking place at studios in London and California. Dido served as a co-producer for the album and enlisted help from a variety of producers including Jeff Bhasker, Jon Brion, Greg Kurstin, Rick Nowels, Plain Pat, Rollo, among others. Musically the album is a pop album with elements of electropop and trip hop.

Girl Who Got Away  received generally positive reviews from music critics, who complimented "folky midtempo melody" and Dido's vocal performances, while others stated that the album didn't "break any new ground". The album fared well commercially: it debuted at number five in the United Kingdom, Dido's fourth album to do so. The album peaked at number one on the Swiss Romandie album charts, at number two on the Swiss and German album charts and at number thirty two on the US Billboard 200. The album also charted within the top twenty of the Australian, Irish and New Zealand charts.

The album was preceded by promotional single "Let Us Move On" featuring Kendrick Lamar, whilst the album's lead single "No Freedom" was released in January 2013 and charted at number fifty-one on the UK Singles Chart. The second single "End of Night" was released in May 2013, however the single failed to chart at all in the United Kingdom but did make appearances on the Belgium charts. To further promote the album Dido did a series of live performances and radio shows making appearances on Jimmy Kimmel Live!, Heart London, Magic Radio, and BBC Radio 2.

Background
Dido revealed shortly after the release of Safe Trip Home that she had been in the studio recording new material, slated for inclusion on her fourth studio album. In July 2009, Dido revealed that the album would have an electronic approach, in an attempt to take it in a totally different direction to her previous albums. In September 2010, Dido unveiled her brand new single, "Everything to Lose", and the track was released via digital download, having previously appeared on the Sex and the City 2 soundtrack. In January 2011, Dido unveiled a second brand new track, "If I Rise", teaming up with producer A.R. Rahman for the track, for which an official music video was released.
Dido announced via her official website that the recording of the album had taken place in both London and California, and that some of the material had been recorded in her own hotel room, with a keyboard and a microphone. She also described the album as a "big, fun, electronic extravaganza".

Music and songs

The opening track and lead single "No Freedom" opens with plaintive acoustic guitar and was penned with Rick Nowels, who previously wrote the major hit "White Flag" (2003). Guitars strum gently, the tempo is mid, and Dido informs her man that their relationship can't flourish unless she's free to wander. On the title track, synthesizer chords puff gentle syncopations as Dido wishes she could be "the girl who got away", shifting and twirling in a slow dance through electronic caresses and the subtlest touches of strings. In the chorus, she sings, "I wanna move with the seasons/And go with the flow". Dido finds guests to keep her current, like Kendrick Lamar, whose rap tears through the conciliatory "Let Us Move On", a spooked trip hop song. The looping intro and muted snares on "Blackbird" are leveled off by her detached vocal and reassuringly familiar lyrics about the darker side of love ("Why do I bring you love, when all you give me back is pain?", she sings). While "End of Night", co-written by Greg Kurstin, has a chorus that echoes out through a flittering line of synth thrills, with Kurstin sending electropop keyboards percolating through the bitter kiss-off to a past lover.

"Sitting on the Roof of the World" carried by folky guitar picking, reflects on sudden pop success and "not knowing how I got there or how to leave," insisting that she'd rather just "fit in" to everyday life. It offers a sobering moment of reflection, and a host of possible allusions to Dido's experiences within the music industry: "Everyone says I was lucky to have got there/ as not many can/ I’d be lying if I said I didn't miss it now and then." "Love to Blame" features "finger-clicking brass" and it includes the line "there's time enough for new things yet," over "pleasingly wobbly low end", a smart instrumental section and all manner of odd bleeping effects. "Go Dreaming", which vows to rise above bullying, moves with a rubbery bassline pushing the track forward as it falls deeper into a well of electronica., while "Happy New Year" features descending bass line and trip hop backbeat, with the singer missing an ex who may be absent or dead, and "Loveless Heart" is epitomised by a vast, sweeping scope, and talks about creeping up and under the defences we’ve put around our feelings, all in an effort to cope in a hectic, modern world. And in "Day Before We Went to War," with keyboards from Brian Eno, Dido sets personal moping aside to come up with a genuine enigma: an eerily pretty vision of mass destruction.

Marketing
The album's official artwork was released on 9 January 2013. On 17 December 2012 Dido released "Let Us Move On" featuring Kendrick Lamar as the first and only promotional single from the album. "No Freedom" was unveiled as the lead single from Girl Who Got Away on BBC Radio 2 at 11.30 am GMT on 11 January 2013. The music video for the song was directed by Ethan Lader. The single was released on 18 January. "End of Night" was released as the official second single from the album on 5 May 2013.

In December 2012, Dido gave an acoustic performance of songs from the album and her older material for Live from Abbey Road. The following month, Dido performed for a select crowd of record label executives and media in Mayfair. On 20 February 2013, Dido performed "No Freedom" and "White Flag" on Jimmy Kimmel Live!. A day later, Dido appeared on Nic Harcourt's KCRW radio show "Morning Becomes Eclectic". In late February, Dido appeared on numerous British radio programs promoting the album such as Heart London, Magic Radio, and BBC Radio 2. On 27 February, the full album was available for streaming on Digital Spy. Dido also appeared on Norwegian-Swedish television talk show Skavlan and British daytime television programme This Morning.

Critical reception

At Metacritic, which assigns a normalized rating out of 100 to reviews from mainstream critics, the album received an average score of 59 based on 12 reviews. Stephen Thomas Erlewine of AllMusic gave the album 4 (out of 5 stars), writing that, "while her last album, Safe Trip Home, was tailored for domesticity, Girl Who Got Away is a soundtrack for a night out," praising Dido for "adapting to her gently shifting surroundings, feeling perfectly at home in this neon-streaked production, savouring how it swings from understated but insistent beats to a soft acoustic bed. Perhaps it's lifestyle music, designed to reflect the aspirations and desires of her audience, but it's impeccably executed and slyly seductive lifestyle music." Robert Copsey of Digital Spy gave the album four out of five stars praising the "pleasantly folky midtempo melody and sleepy vocal" as well as the album's "unexpected and – whisper it – dancier direction". Caroline Sullivan of The Guardian called "a Dido album that doesn't induce a desire to listen to something else," calling it "surprisingly interesting."

Laurence Green of musicOMH wrote that, "As an album, it doesn't break any new ground --it doesn't try to. What it does do though is sweep itself up in a groundswell of beautiful, heart-tugging nostalgia so strong it's as if 2003 lies just beyond the window again, shimmering in the haze of the morning dew." Nick Levine of BBC Music gave a favourable review, writing that, "Admittedly, the album contains the odd soporific song like No Freedom, but these turns are outweighed by tracks with a strong tune or an unexpected hint of sadness. Certainly, there's enough going on here to make the naysayers feel guilty for blurting out that b-word." Andy Johnson of PopMatters gave the album 4 (out of 10 stars), writing that Dido's new moves on the album, "tend to feel half-baked, under-exploited or, in the case of Kendrick Lamar's appearance on 'Let Us Move On', just a bit hackneyed." For Andy Gill of The Independent, "it ticks along unremarkably on smudges of synthesiser and shuffling drum programmes, augmented by acoustic guitar or synthetic brass stabs."

Commercial performance
Girl Who Got Away made it into the top 5 of seven album charts, being Dido's fourth album to do so in the United Kingdom. On the UK Albums Chart, the album debuted at number 5, becoming her fourth top-five album, but her lowest charting album (all of her previous albums, peaked inside the top-three). In France, the album charted higher, debuting and peaking at number 3, matching the same position of her previous album, Safe Trip Home, (2008). In Germany, the album debuted and peaked at number 2, her highest since Life for Rent, (2003). The album also peaked at number 2 on the Swiss Albums Chart, however it broke her strike of consecutive number-one albums (with Life for Rent and Safe Trip Home), becoming her only album to not reach the number-one position, alongside her debut album, No Angel, (1999). Nevertheless, the album peaked at number 1 in the French-speaking part of Switzerland (Romandie).

In Australia, the album only managed to peak at number 12, becoming her only album to miss the top ten. In Canada, it peaked at number 10, becoming her fourth consecutive top-ten album, but also her lowest charting album. In the United States, the album only peaked at number 32, becoming her first album to miss the top-twenty and, subsequently, her lowest charting album.

Track listing
Credits adapted from the album's liner notes.

Chart performance

Weekly charts

Year-end charts

Certifications

Release history

References

Dido (singer) albums
2013 albums
Synth-pop albums by English artists
RCA Records albums
Albums produced by Greg Kurstin
Albums produced by Plain Pat
Albums produced by Rollo Armstrong